Byeong Sam Jeon (born January 20, 1977) is an internationally recognized South Korean artist who lives in Seoul and New York. One of his large-scale art installations is CD PROJECT that turned an abandoned old tobacco factory into a shiny dream factory through decorating the 180 meter-long and 32 meter-high outer wall of the factory building with the total 489,440 flattering compact discs collected by 27,912 people from 288 organizations in 31 cities of 9 countries. The total number of the CDs installed was counted by the official Guinness World Records, and announced as the 'Largest Display of Compact Discs'. His works and sketch/prototypes of the giant installations have sold for substantial sums of money by the galleries and private collectors.

He holds a master's degree in fine arts from the School of the Art Institute of Chicago, and also holds the master's degree in information and computer science from the University of California, Irvine. The Ministry of Science, ICT and Future Planning of South Korea announced him as one of the representative convergence type personnel 'Homo Creaens' in 2014. His work explores how interdisciplinary research influences the society in creative ways and makes the world more diverse.  One of his well-known works, Telematic Drum Circle has gathered more than 320,000 Internet users and offline participants from 59 countries to promote global harmony across the world since it was released in September 2007 at the California Institute of Telecommunication and Information Technology. Byeong Sam Jeon has presented his work worldwide mainly including: SIGGRAPH (United States), ISIMD (Turkey), AsiaGraph (China), ArtBots (Ireland), Salon (Cuba), LIFE (Russia), Netfilmmakers (Denmark), SIAF (Japan), TMCA (South Korea), Siggraph ASIA (Singapore), and many more. He also worked as the executive creative director of the 2015 Cheongju International Craft Biennale, and brought 310,000 visitors in 40 days of the event.

References 

 MBC TV News: Giant Sculpture with 500,000 CDs holds the Guinness World Records
 MBN Newspaper: Imagining to cover the Great Wall of China with compact discs. Communication between the world and art
 KBS TV Lecture: IT Concert: Watch, Connect, and Actualize it!

Notable works  
 CD PROJECT
 Dynamic Relaxation
 Pangdoranee
 Beautility
 GreenSphere
 Jeon-Byeong-Sam-Ryong-Ee
 Dream of the Sky
 Dialogues 
 Digital MEM
 Dotted Nature
 Telematic Drum Circle
 Drop Drop
 Ten Worlds: Garden of Life
 We Are Romantic 
 Miscommunication
 Dool-Momzit
 Half Moon
 Zoo II
 Nameless Baby
 Dreaming Bus
 Buddha's Inn
 Freedom Exists or Not

1977 births
Living people
South Korean artists
People from Seoul
School of the Art Institute of Chicago alumni
University of California, Irvine alumni